Cruelty Squad is a tactical first-person shooter developed by Finnish studio Consumer Softproducts managed by artist Ville Kallio and released in early access on Steam on 4 January 2021 and fully released on 15 June 2021. In the game, the player takes on the role of a biologically-augmented assassin employed by the titular wetwork security company. The player is tasked with performing black operations for its host conglomerate and must kill various targets in order to progress. The game has been described by the developer as "an immersive power fantasy simulator with tactical stealth elements". The game is notable for its surreal aesthetic, inspired by the likes of LSD: Dream Emulator and Super Mario 64, complete with wobbly, low-poly 3D models, psychedelic color palette, low-quality distorted audio, grotesque depictions of augmentations, bizarre cacophonic music, and pixelated-looking, unfiltered textures.

Gameplay 
The player chooses their weaponry and equipment before starting each of the 19 missions present in the game, and then must traverse open, sandbox-style levels in order to neutralize targets. Health lost during combat can be regained by using certain equipment, consuming cooked giblets, or even consuming corpses should the player die enough times on a level ("Power In Misery", the easiest difficulty mode). While there is no penalty for killing civilians during a mission, silent and non-lethal solutions are also possible outside of the necessary killing of targets. Outside of and during missions, the player can trade human organs and fish on a dynamic stock market for money, or explore their headquarters.

Synopsis

Setting 
Cruelty Squad is set in a dystopian corporatocracy where corporations possess overwhelming influence over police and government affairs; technological advances allow people to be resurrected after death, rendering much of humanity immortal and cheapening the perceived value of life. Indiscriminate killings are commonplace, and armed security is a fixture of virtually every populated area. Human organs are sold on the stock market, and invasive biological implants and augmented organs are used by security forces and assassins to aid in combat.

Corporate contract killings are handled in part by Cruelty Squad, a wetwork security company working under the umbrella of a large conglomerate.

Plot 
After being discharged from the "SEC Death Unit", the unnamed protagonist receives a phone call from his enigmatic handler, who offers him employment within Cruelty Squad. He is tasked to kill a number of people who have drawn the ire of conglomerate "higher-ups"; these include anti-corporate politicians, cultists, corrupt police officers, delinquent employees, and rival CEOs.

Development 
Cruelty Squad was produced within the Godot game engine. It was fully released on Steam on 16 June 2021.

Pre-Cruelty Squad work 
Prior to the development of Cruelty Squad, lead developer and artist Ville Kallio created and exhibited multiple artistic works consisting of comics and video art, as well as installations and standalone artworks for galleries. Notable museums he has exhibited include the Futura in Prague, and the SIC Gallery in Helsinki, Finland. Many of these previous artworks contain allusions to video games, as well as many ideas that would later become parts of Cruelty Squad. Kallio has said that his gallery work "never really felt like more than just a weird hobby" and that it was like "a black hole with no future", stating that going into game development felt sensible since his previous work had been heavily inspired by video games.

Other than gallery pieces, Kallio has produced many video projects before the release of Cruelty Squad, such as "Adversalife" and "Venmo Combat", which was also a component of a multimedia art exhibition hosted at the SIC Gallery in Helsinki, Finland. Additionally, he worked on comics such as HYPER PRISON-INDUSTRIAL and CORRIDORSPACE.

Reception 

Cruelty Squad received "generally favorable" reviews, according to review aggregator Metacritic.

James Brod of Third Coast Review described the game as "grislier than Hotline Miami" and recommended it to fans of "old school tactical shooters". Jake Tucker of NME declared Cruelty Squad to be the "most compelling game of the year", awarding it five stars out of five. Many outlets also commented on the harshness of the visuals, with Rock Paper Shotgun's Graham Smith dubbing them "sensorally aggressive". James Davenport of PC Gamer called it "some prime existential PC gaming horror."

In June 2021, the protagonist of Cruelty Squad was added to the video game Brigador as a playable character, under the name "MT Foxtrot".

References

External links 
 Cruelty Squad on Steam

2021 video games
Biopunk
Dystopian video games
First-person shooters
Retro-style video games
Satirical video games
Existentialist video games
Video games developed in Finland
Windows games
Windows-only games
Cyberpunk video games
Postmodern works
Psychedelic art
Fiction about assassinations
Self-reflexive video games
Science fantasy video games
Surrealist video games
Metafictional video games
Mass murder in fiction
Weird fiction video games
Post-apocalyptic video games
Fiction about immortality
Immersive sims